Yodsak Chaowana (born 20 April 1996) is a Thai professional footballer who plays as a forward for Thai League 1 club Police Tero.

References

External links
 at Soccerway

1992 births
Living people
Yodsak Chaowana
Yodsak Chaowana
Yodsak Chaowana
Yodsak Chaowana
Association football forwards